Marta Skupilová (born 28 July 1938 deceased August 25, 2017) is a retired swimmer from Czechoslovakia who won a bronze medal in the 100 m butterfly at the 1958 European Aquatics Championships. She also competed in this event at the 1956 Summer Olympics, but did not reach the final.

References

1938 births
Living people
Czechoslovak female swimmers
Swimmers at the 1956 Summer Olympics
Olympic swimmers of Czechoslovakia
European Aquatics Championships medalists in swimming
Female butterfly swimmers